Lak Si is one of the 50 districts (khet) of Bangkok, Thailand. It is bounded by (from the north clockwise): Don Mueang, Bang Khen and Chatuchak of Bangkok; Mueang Nonthaburi district and Pak Kret district of Nonthaburi province.

History
The name Lak Si means 'fourth milestone'. The community here was called Lak Si because it is at the fourth milestone of Khlong Prem Prachakon (คลองเปรมประชากร) (canal) dug during King Chulalongkorn's reign linking Bangkok to Bang Pa-in. Lak Si became a district on 21 November 1997, separating from Don Mueang District.

Administration
The district is divided into two sub-districts (khwaeng).

References

External links
 BMA website with the tourism landmarks of Lak Si
 Lak Si district office (Thai only)

 
Districts of Bangkok